Meadow Park was a football ground in Dumbarton, Scotland. It was the home ground of Dumbarton Harp.

History
Dumbarton Harp played at Meadow Park from the foundation in 1894. By World War I a pavilion had been built in the south-east corner of the ground. In 1923 the club were elected into the Scottish Football League (SFL), and around the same time, a stand was erected on the western side of the pitch. The first SFL match played at Meadow Park was on 25 August 1923, when Harp lost 3–2 to Clackmannan. The ground's probable record attendance of 3,000 was set later in the season for a Scottish Qualifying Cup match against Queen of the South in October 1923.

Harp folded in 1925; their last league match at the ground was played on 25 January 1925, a 3–1 defeat to Dykehead in front of only 140 spectators, their lowest recorded attendance during their time in the SFL. Meadow Park remained in use as a football ground until 1950, when the pavilion and stand were demolished and it was left as an open playing field. The site is now an industrial unit used by Aggreko.

References

Defunct football venues in Scotland
Dumbarton Harp F.C.
Scottish Football League venues
Sports venues in West Dunbartonshire